An incantation is a formula of words sung or spoken during a ceremony or ritual.

Incantation may also refer to:


Music
 Incantation (band), an American death metal band
 Incantation (musical group), a group of British and South American music performers
 Incantation, a song by Loreena McKennitt, from her 2006 album An Ancient Muse
 Incantation, a 1996 album by contemporary Celtic, neopagan singer Sharon Knight
 Incantations (album), a 1978 music album by Mike Oldfield
 Incantations (composition), a 2008 percussion concerto by Einojuhani Rautavaara
 Incantations (Waterhouse), 2015 composition for piano and ensemble by Graham Waterhouse

Video games
 Incantation (1989 video game), a 1989 Nintendo Entertainment System video game
 Incantation (video game), a 1996 Super Nintendo Entertainment System video game

Other uses
 Merseburg Incantations, two medieval magic spells in Old High German
 Incantation, a book written by Alice Hoffman
 The Incantation, a 2018 American horror film
 Incantation (film), a 2022 Taiwanese horror film

See also
Enchantment (disambiguation)